Go! Live Your Way is an Argentinian musical and romance streaming television series created by Sebastián Mellino. The story follows a musically skilled teenager, Mía Cáceres, who wins a scholarship to study at a prestigious academy, where her path to achieving her goal will not be easy, since she will have to face the injustices that stand between her and her dream. In Season 2, she sets out looking for her father. The series, directed by its creator Sebastián Mellino, stars Pilar Pascual, Renata Toscano Bruzon, José Giménez Zapiola, Santiago Sáez, Gastón Ricaud and Laura Azcurra, as well as Axel Muñiz, Carmela Barsamián, Paulo Sánchez Lima, María José Cardozo, María José Chicar, Bautista Lena, Manuel Ramos, Daniel Rosado, Simón Hempe, Carolina Domenech and Antonella Carabelli. It is the second Argentinian Netflix Original Series after Edha.

The first season of fifteen episodes was released on Netflix on 22 February 2019. The second season, which also consists of fifteen episodes, was released on the 21 June 2019. A spin-off film titled “Go! The Unforgettable Party” was released in November 15, 2019 on Netflix. Even though a third season had been announced in February 2020 on the show’s official Instagram page, Pascual confirmed in August 2020 that the series had been cancelled, even though it was still unconfirmed by Netflix. As of February 2021, most of the cast members of the series had moved on to other projects, including the Argentine series “Mi Amigo Hormiga” (English: My Ant Friend), the Disney+ Latin America series “Intertwined”, and the Netflix Latin America series “Cielo Grande" (English: Secrets of Summer).

Plot
Mia Caceres (Pilar Pascual) is a talented singer/dancer, who wants to pursue her dreams of being a musician. She is the lead singer of her band, Sold Out, she started alongside her lifelong best friend Gaspar Fontan (Axel Muñiz). However, she wants to pursue her dreams by auditioning for a scholarship at the prestigious boarding school known for its elite dancing and singing workshop - Saint Mary. After much discussion with her aunt Isabel (Melania Lenoir), she finally agrees. Mia auditions, but doesn't get a Scholarship, and goes home devastated. Her aunt says they'll find the perfect school for her in Spain, where her son lives. But what Mia doesn't know is that Isabel went to talk to Ramiro Achával (Gaston Ricaud), who happens to be the owner of the school and used to be in a relationship with Marianna Caceres (Mia's mother). Ramiro decides to tell Gloria, the secretary to make a call and accept Mia into the school, behind Mercedes' (Laura Azcurra) (the principal and Ramiro's wife) back. Isabel let's Mia enter the school, but Mia has no idea what's about to happen to her life. She and her best friends, Zoe (Carmela Barsamien) and Simon (Paulo Sanchez Lima) enter the Go workshop, however, Mia must face the daughter of the school owner, Lupe (Renata Toscano Bruzón). Lupe is the most talented and the most popular in the school, but since Mia came, all the attention went to Mia, so she gets jealous. Lupe tries everything to get Mia kicked out of the workshop, but Mia does not give up. Both Lupe and Mia face many fights with each other, but Mia doesn't want to hurt Lupe, so she tries to make peace with her, however that does not work out at all. Lupe gets even more jealous of Mia, which creates a strong rivalry between Mia, Lupe and Lupe's mother, Mercedes (the principal). And with all that happening, she also has to face Alvaro and Juanma, who both like Mia. Alvaro is the captain of the basketball team and Lupe's brother, therefore Zoe tells her not to get involved with his life, but Alvaro tries to convince Mia to be with him. Alvaro's main rival is Juanma who is Lupe's stuck-up boyfriend, who secretly likes Mia. The show follows Mia's and other characters' lives at the school, their conflicts and their love lives.

Cast

Main 
 Pilar Pascual as Mía Cáceres
 José Gimenez Zapiola as Álvaro Paz
 Renata Toscano as Lupe Achával
 Santiago Saez as Juanma Portolesi
 Axel Muñiz as Gaspar Fontán
 Carmela Barsamian as Zoe Celetian
 Paulo Sanchez Lima as Simon (Last name is currently unknown.)
 María José (Majo) Cardozo as Agustina
 María José (Majo) Chicar as Sofia
 Gaston Ricaud as Ramiro Achával
 Laura Azcurra as Mercedes Achával

Recurring 

 Simón Hempe as Federico Nacas
 Daniel Rosado as Nicolás Longo
 Manuel Ramos as Tobias Acera
 Bautista Lena as Martín Beltrán
 Antonella Carabelli as Olivia Andrade
 Carolina Domenech as Lola 
 Nicole Luis as Ivana
 Ana Paula Pérez as Martina
 Sofía Morandi as Nina Canale
 Agustina Mindlin as Mara Mucci
 Andrés Montorfano as Mauro Moreira
 Ana Florencio Gutiérrez as Gloria
 Gonzalo Revoredo as Marcelo Villa
 Florencia Benitez as Florencia
 Josefina Achával as Mariana Cáceres
 Melania Lenoir as Isabel Cáceres
 Samuel Nascimento as Fabricio
 Johanna Francella as Rosario
 Yosy Machado as Yosy
 Luisa Drozdek as Teresa
 Daniel Campomenosi as Javier Paz
 Marina Castillo as Hortensia

References

External links
 

2019 Argentine television series debuts
2019 Argentine television series endings
Spanish-language Netflix original programming
Musical television series
2010s Argentine television series
2010s music television series
Television series about teenagers